Dragiša Šarić (27 January 1961 – 19 July 2008) was a Serbian basketball player and coach.

Career

Club career
Šarić played for several clubs in his country, most notably with the KK Partizan generation that won the 1991–92 Euroleague.

Coaching career
Šarić was an assistant coach with Partizan. Before that, he was also the head coach of Vizura.

Šarić was also player-coach for Úrvalsdeild karla club Skallagrímur from July 1999 until his resignation in November that same year.

Death
Šarić died while on a vacation in Pula, Croatia on 19 July 2008 from heart-related issues.

References

External links
 Úrvalsdeild statistics

1961 births
2008 deaths
KK Beobanka players
KK Partizan players
KK Vojvodina players
KK Vizura coaches
KK Profikolor players
KK Radnik Bijeljina players
Serbian men's basketball players
Serbian men's basketball coaches
Small forwards
KK Mega Basket coaches
BKK Radnički players
Serbian expatriate basketball people in Hungary
Serbian expatriate basketball people in Iceland
Serbian expatriate basketball people in Bosnia and Herzegovina
Serbs of Bosnia and Herzegovina
People from Bijeljina
Úrvalsdeild karla (basketball) coaches
Úrvalsdeild karla (basketball) players
Skallagrímur men's basketball players
Skallagrímur men's basketball coaches